Zeidan (Arabic: زيدان‎) is an Arabic name that may refer to the following notable people:
Given name
Zeidan Atashi (born 1940), Israeli Druze former diplomat and politician
Zeidan Kafafi, Jordanian archaeologist and academic

Surname
Ali Zeidan (born 1950), Prime Minister of Libya
Ayman Zeidan (born 1956), Syrian actor, TV host
Moustafa Zeidan (born 1998), Swedish football player
Nada Zeidan, Palestinian road racer
Rima Zeidan (born 1990), Taiwanese-Lebanese presenter, model and actress
Salwa Zeidan, Lebanese artist, sculptor, and curator

See also
Zaydan

Arabic masculine given names
Arabic-language surnames